Warner Revolution may refer to:

Warner Revolution I, a single-seat American homebuilt aircraft
Warner Revolution II, a two-seat American homebuilt aircraft